Semer is a small village and civil parish in Suffolk, England. Located adjacent to a bridge over the River Brett on the B1115 between Hadleigh and Stowmarket, it is part of Babergh district. The parish also contains the hamlets of Ash Street and Drakestone Green.

The parish was recorded in the 2011 census as having a population of 130, down from 158 in the previous census.

History
Semer is recorded in the Domesday Book as belonging to Bury St Edmunds Abbey in both 1066 and 1086.  The abbey acted as both Lord of the Manor and Tenant-In-Chief.
The village is recorded as home to 20 households: six villagers, 13 small holders and one slave. It is recorded as having enough ploughland for 3 lord's plough teams and 3 men's plough teems; and the village also had 12 acres of meadow, a mill, a church, 0.25 acres of church land, 16 cattle, 2 cobs, 24 pigs and 97 sheep.

In 1086 the village is valued as worth £6 a year to its lord, Bury St Edmunds Abbey, a £1 increase on its value in 1066. Its taxable value is recorded as 3.8 geld units and 2.5 villtax.

All Saints Church 
The small church is set a few hundred yards off of a minor road across a meadow beside the River Brett, It is almost entirely Victorianised with a chancel that was rebuilt in 1870. One notable feature of the graveyard,  to the east of the church, is a marble Edwardian angel scattering roses.

The church has a plain square-cut font which is thought to be 14th-century, as is the nave. There is also a Royal Arms of King George III, painted before the union with Ireland.

Hamlets

Ash Street

Prior to the Norman Conquest of 1066, the hamlet was owned by an unnamed "Free Woman". After the Conquest it is recorded as under the Lordship of William the Conqueror's half-brother: Robert, Count of Mortain.

Drakestone Green

References

External links

 

Villages in Suffolk
Babergh District
Civil parishes in Suffolk